Toomemägi (or Toome Hill;  or ) is a hill in Tartu, Estonia.

Geologically, Toomemägi is part of the Emajõgi's ancient valley.

Toomemägi is site of Tartu's beginnings. By the 7th century CE, local inhabitants had built wooden fortifications on the east side of Toomemägi. In medieval times, there was also a bishop's castle.

Landmarks on Toomemägi:
Tartu Cathedral
Gunpowder Cellar of Tartu
University of Tartu Old Observatory
several monuments to people related to Tartu University
Supreme Court of Estonia
Devil's Bridge
Angel's Bridge

References

External links

Hills of Estonia
Tartu